Lebistina is a genus of beetles in the family Carabidae, containing the following species:

 Lebistina bicolor Chaudoir, 1878 
 Lebistina caffra Chaudoir, 1877 
 Lebistina flavomaculata (Dejean, 1831) 
 Lebistina holubi Peringuey, 1896 
 Lebistina neuvillei Alluaud, 1918 
 Lebistina peringueyi Liebke, 1928 
 Lebistina picta (Dejean, 1825) 
 Lebistina rufomarginata Basilewsky, 1948 
 Lebistina sanguinea (Boheman, 1848) 
 Lebistina spectabilis Peringuey, 1904 
 Lebistina subcruciata Fairmaire, 1894 
 Lebistina unicolor (Putzeys, 1880)

References

Lebiinae